Douglas Robert Kerslake (March 23, 1950 – April 25, 2015) was a Canadian professional ice hockey player. He played 23 games in the WHA with the Edmonton Oilers.

References

External links

1950 births
2015 deaths
Canadian ice hockey right wingers
Dallas Black Hawks players
Edmonton Oilers (WHA) players
Flint Generals players
Greensboro Generals (SHL) players
Ice hockey people from Saskatchewan
Philadelphia Flyers draft picks
Roanoke Valley Rebels (EHL) players
Sportspeople from Saskatoon